A Cuban sunset is cocktail made from rum and a mixture of lemonade, lime soda, guava nectar, and grenadine syrup.

The drink is made from rum and a mixture of lime soda, lemonade, guava nectar, and grenadine syrup. It originated in either Havana or Varadero as a variety of a traditional Cuban guava-based drink. In Cuba, the drink is commonly served (along with either a Cubata or Mojito) as a pre-dinner drink. The Cuban variety of the cocktail commonly uses extra guava nectar in place of grenadine syrup, and the drink normally contains Havana Club rum. Outside of Cuba, many recipes call for the use of Bacardi White Rum.

See also 
 List of cocktails

References 

Cocktails with rum
Cocktails with lemonade
Cocktails with fruit juice
Cocktails with grenadine
Tiki drinks
Bubbly cocktails
Sweet cocktails
Cuban cocktails